The 47th parallel south is a circle of latitude that is 47 degrees south of the Earth's equatorial plane. It crosses the Atlantic Ocean, the Indian Ocean, Australasia, the Pacific Ocean and South America.

At this latitude the sun is visible for 15 hours, 54 minutes during the December solstice and 8 hours, 31 minutes during the June solstice.

Around the world
Starting at the Prime Meridian and heading eastwards, the parallel 47° south passes through:

{| class="wikitable plainrowheaders"
! scope="col" width="125" | Co-ordinates
! scope="col" | Country, territory or ocean
! scope="col" | Notes
|-
| style="background:#b0e0e6;" | 
! scope="row" style="background:#b0e0e6;" | Atlantic Ocean
| style="background:#b0e0e6;" |
|-
| style="background:#b0e0e6;" | 
! scope="row" style="background:#b0e0e6;" | Indian Ocean
| style="background:#b0e0e6;" | Passing just south of the Prince Edward Islands, 
|-
| style="background:#b0e0e6;" | 
! scope="row" style="background:#b0e0e6;" | Pacific Ocean
| style="background:#b0e0e6;" | Tasman Sea
|-
| 
! scope="row" | 
| Stewart Island
|-
| style="background:#b0e0e6;" | 
! scope="row" style="background:#b0e0e6;" | Pacific Ocean
| style="background:#b0e0e6;" |
|-
| 
! scope="row" | 
| Gulf of San Esteban and Northern Patagonian Ice Field, Aysén Region
|-
| 
! scope="row" | 
| Santa Cruz Province
|-
| style="background:#b0e0e6;" | 
! scope="row" style="background:#b0e0e6;" | Atlantic Ocean
| style="background:#b0e0e6;" |
|}

See also
46th parallel south
48th parallel south

s47